Pomorie Point (Nos Pomorie \'nos po-'mo-ri-e\) is a point on the coast of McFarlane Strait forming the north side of the entrance to Lister Cove, Varna Peninsula, Livingston Island in the South Shetland Islands, Antarctica.

The point is named after the Bulgarian town of Pomorie.

Location

Maps
 South Shetland Islands. Scale 1:200000 topographic map. DOS 610 Sheet W 62 60. Tolworth, UK, 1968.
 L.L. Ivanov et al. Antarctica: Livingston Island and Greenwich Island, South Shetland Islands. Scale 1:100000 topographic map. Sofia: Antarctic Place-names Commission of Bulgaria, 2005.
 L.L. Ivanov. Antarctica: Livingston Island and Greenwich, Robert, Snow and Smith Islands. Scale 1:120000 topographic map. Troyan: Manfred Wörner Foundation, 2010.  (First edition 2009. )
 Antarctic Digital Database (ADD). Scale 1:250000 topographic map of Antarctica. Scientific Committee on Antarctic Research (SCAR). Since 1993, regularly updated.
 L.L. Ivanov. Antarctica: Livingston Island and Smith Island. Scale 1:100000 topographic map. Manfred Wörner Foundation, 2017.

References
 Pomorie Point. SCAR Composite Antarctic Gazetteer
 Bulgarian Antarctic Gazetteer. Antarctic Place-names Commission. (details in Bulgarian, basic data in English)

External links
 Pomorie Point. Copernix satellite image

Headlands of Livingston Island
Bulgaria and the Antarctic